The Atlanta Terminal Subdivision is a railroad line owned by CSX Transportation in the U.S. State of Georgia. The Atlanta Terminal Subdivision is broken up into 5 sections known as "Charts" according to the CSX Transportation Timetable #3.

Chart A
At its north end it continues south from the W&A Subdivision and at its south end it continues south as the Georgia Subdivision.

Chart B
At its north end it continues south from the Abbeville Subdivision and at its south end it continues south as the W&A Subdivision.

Chart C
At its north end it branches off from the Atlanta Terminal Subdivision Chart A and at its south end it continues south as the Manchester Subdivision.

Chart D
At its north end it branches off from the Atlanta Terminal Subdivision Chart A and at its south end it continues south as the A&WP Subdivision.

Chart E
At its north end it branches off from the Atlanta Terminal Subdivision Chart B and at its south end connects with the Atlanta Terminal Subdivision Chart A.

See also
 List of CSX Transportation lines

References

CSX Transportation lines
Rail infrastructure in Georgia (U.S. state)